WHGV (99.5 FM) is a Christian hip hop radio station licensed to LaCrosse, Florida, broadcasting to the Gainesville, Florida area. WCYZ (99.7 FM) is a Contemporary Christian music radio station licensed to Silver Springs Shores, Florida, broadcasting to the Ocala, Florida area. The stations are owned by Ricardo Arroyo, and operated by Central Florida Educational Association, Inc. An acquisition of the stations by Central Florida Educational Association is pending.

History
Prior to June 1, 2013, the then-WBXY programmed a news/talk format as 99.5 The Star. At that time, following the station's sale from Asterisk Communications to JVC Media, it changed to a dance format billed as "Party 99.5," whose direction was patterned after its sister station in Long Island, New York, WPTY. On December 26, 2013, WBXY's dance format moved to WXJZ; the two stations simulcast until January 2014, when JVC announced the sale of WBXY to RDA Broadcast Holdings, LLC. The sale to RDA Broadcast Holdings, at a price of $3.5 million, was consummated on June 3, 2014; on June 4, 2014, RDA flipped WBXY to a simulcast of the then-WGMA, a new adult standards station in Ocala that had signed on at 99.7 in March. WBXY changed its call sign to WGMW on June 5, 2014. WGMW and WGMA changed their format from adult standards to soft adult contemporary on June 6, 2016.

On August 1, 2022, WGMW changed its format to Christian hip hop as a simulcast of WPOZ-HD2, and WGMA changed its format to Christian adult contemporary as a simulcast of WPOZ. Both switches are part of an acquisition by the station's operator Central Florida Educational Association. On September 1, 2022, WGMW changed its call sign to WHGV and WGMA changed its call sign to WCYZ.

Previous logo

References

External links
Official Website

Radio stations established in 1999
1999 establishments in Florida
Christian radio stations in Florida
Mainstream adult contemporary radio stations in the United States